Heyse is a surname of German origin. Notable people with the name include:

 Johann Christian August Heyse (17641829), German grammarian and lexicographer, father of Karl Wilhelm Ludwig
 Karl Wilhelm Ludwig Heyse (17971855), German philologist, son of Johann Christian August, father of Paul
 Paul Heyse (18301914), German writer and translator, son of Karl Wilhelm Ludwig
 Ulrich Heyse (190670), German U-boat commander in World War II

See also 
 Genzsch & Heyse, A.G., a German type foundry established in Hamburg
 

Surnames of German origin